The Royal Liver Building  is a Grade I listed building in Liverpool, England. It is located at the Pier Head and along with the neighbouring Cunard Building and Port of Liverpool Building is one of Liverpool's Three Graces, which line the city's waterfront. It was also part of Liverpool's formerly UNESCO-designated World Heritage Maritime Mercantile City.

Opened in 1911, the building was the purpose-built home of the Royal Liver Assurance group, which had been set up in the city in 1850 to provide locals with assistance related to losing a wage-earning relative.

The Royal Liver Building is one of the most recognisable landmarks in the city of Liverpool with its two fabled Liver Birds which watch over the city and the sea. Legend has it that if these two birds were to fly away, the city would cease to exist.

The Liver Birds are 5.5 metres,18 feet high. Their added height gives the Royal Liver Building an overall height of 103.7 metres, 340 feet. A building of skyscraper proportion, and once one of the tallest buildings in the country, the Royal Liver Building is currently the 4th tallest building in Liverpool.

History
In 1907, the Royal Liver Group had over 6,000 employees and given the need for larger premises the company approved the construction of a new head office. Designed by Walter Aubrey Thomas, the foundation stone for the building was laid on 11 May 1908 and just 3 years later, on 19 July 1911, the building was officially opened by Lord Sheffield. The building is an early example of a building constructed using reinforced concrete, and given the building's radical design was considered by some to "be impossible to build".

During the early 1950s, the sixth floor was occupied and used by No 3 Movements Unit (Embarkation) of the Royal Air Force, overseeing and controlling the movement of RAF personnel and goods through the port.
In 1953, electronic chimes were installed to serve as a memorial to the members of the Royal Liver Friendly Society who died during the two World Wars. During hours of darkness, the clock dials are illuminated.

The building remained the head office for Royal Liver Assurance until its merger with Royal London Group in 2011.

In October 2016, the building was put up for sale for the first time in its history. The owner instructed CBRE Group to list the sale with a guide price of more than £40m. In February 2017, Luxembourg-based investment group, Corestate Capital, bought the building for £48 million along with Everton F.C. majority shareholder Farhad Moshiri. Moshiri planned to run Everton's affairs from the building and have his own office to include a view of the new stadium on Bramley Moore Dock.

In 2019, as part of a larger repositioning of the building, a visitor attraction was opened giving the public the chance to tour the West Clock Tower of the building on a regular basis for the first time in its then 108 year history. Previously this had only been open to the public during Heritage Open Days, which have been running during September each year since 1994.

Description

The building overlooks the River Mersey from its waterfront location on the Pier Head and forms one of the 'Three Graces' along with the Port of Liverpool Building and the Cunard Building. This is reflected in the building's Grade I listed building status. It has 13 floors.
The Liver birds are 5.5 metres,18 feet tall. Crowning, they give they give the skyscraper a height of 103.7 metres, 340 feet.

More akin to the early tall American skyscrapers, the Royal Liver Building closely resembles H. H. Richardson's Allegheny Court House (built in 1884) and Adler & Sullivan's Schiller Theatre—with no definitive exterior styling but eclectic references to the Baroque and Byzantine.

The building is crowned by a pair of clock towers: as a ship passed along the river, mariners could tell the time from these. The clocks were made by Gent and Co. of Leicester.
The four clock faces have no numerals, only facets indicating the 12 hours. These are disposed as three on the riverside tower, facing west/north/south, the remaining one on the landward tower facing east. There is only one mechanism driving the faces on both of the towers. They were originally named George clocks, because they were started at the precise time that King George V was crowned on 22 June 1911.

Atop each tower stand the mythical Liver Birds, designed by Carl Bernard Bartels. The birds are named Bella and Bertie, looking to the sea and inland, respectively. Bella may possibly be named for Isabella of Angoulême, the queen consort of King John, when Liverpool was granted its royal charter. Bertie may possibly be named for Edward VII (known as Bertie to the royal family) who was King of the United Kingdom of Great Britain and Ireland at the time of the building's construction. Popular legend has it that while one giant bird looks out over the city to protect its people, the other bird looks out to sea at the new sailors coming in to port. Alternatively, local legend states one Liver Bird is male, looking inland to see if the pubs are open, whilst the other is female, looking out to sea to see if there are any handsome sailors coming up the river.

It is also said that, if one of the birds were to fly away the city of Liverpool would cease to exist, thus adding to the mystery of the birds. As a result, both birds are chained to the domes upon which they stand; although this could simply be because the originally gilded Liver birds, of a moulded and hammered copper construction (that is itself fixed onto a rolled-steel armature) are eighteen feet high, ten feet long and themselves carry in their beaks an intricately cast sprig of seaweed. Additionally, however, their heads are three-and-a-half feet long, their wing spread is twelve feet and their legs measure two feet in circumference. The two birds – officially cormorants – have identical and almost traditional poses, standing upright with half-raised wings.

Tenants

There are currently over 19 tenants in the Royal Liver Building:
 Amaze
 Captivate Presentations
 Crowd Mortgage
 Tilney Bestinvest
 Easirent
 Epic New Media
 Culture City
 Everton FC
 Grant Thornton
 HSBC
 ITV
 Mott MacDonald
 The Venue at the Royal Liver Building
 Pershing
 Princes Group
 Publiship
 Richard Hogg Lindley
 SportPesa
 USS
 Royal Liver Building 360 – A visitor attraction based in the West Clock Tower
 Liverpool Vaults & Liverpool Bullion

Gallery

See also
Architecture of Liverpool

Notes

References

External links

Grade I listed buildings in Liverpool
Grade I listed office buildings
Buildings and structures completed in 1911
Art Nouveau architecture in Liverpool
Art Nouveau commercial buildings